Steve Dunlap (born February 4, 1954) was the assistant head coach and Special Teams Coordinator for the West Virginia Mountaineers football team.  Dunlap had been with the Mountaineers on and off throughout his 33-year coaching career on the defensive side of the football.  Dunlap has served on the staff of 16 bowl teams and coached in the 1988 National Championship Game. His 1996 West Virginia Mountaineers football team defense was ranked #1 in the nation.

Early life and playing years
Dunlap is an alumnus of West Virginia University.  He received a bachelor's degree in 1976.  He also played linebacker at WVU.  He was a three-year letter winner 1973-75.  Dunlap set the schools records for total tackles in a season (190) and tackles in a single game (28.)  Today he still ranks no. 10 on the school’s career tackle list with 359.  He was also a member of the 1975 Peach Bowl team that defeated NC State.

References

1954 births
Living people
Marshall Thundering Herd football coaches
Navy Midshipmen football coaches
NC State Wolfpack football coaches
Syracuse Orange football coaches
West Virginia Mountaineers football coaches
West Virginia Mountaineers football players
People from Hurricane, West Virginia